Chiltern District Council in Buckinghamshire, England was elected every four years from 1973 until 2020. Since the last boundary changes in 2003, 40 councillors were elected from 25 wards.

Political control
From the first election to the council in 1973 until its merger into Buckinghamshire Council in 2020, political control of the council was held by the following parties:

Leadership
The leaders of the council from 2001 until its abolition in 2020 were:

Council elections
1973 Chiltern District Council election
1976 Chiltern District Council election (New ward boundaries)
1979 Chiltern District Council election
1983 Chiltern District Council election
1987 Chiltern District Council election (District boundary changes took place but the number of seats remained the same)
1991 Chiltern District Council election (District boundary changes took place but the number of seats remained the same)
1995 Chiltern District Council election
1999 Chiltern District Council election
2003 Chiltern District Council election (New ward boundaries reduced the number of seats by 10)
2007 Chiltern District Council election (Some new ward boundaries)
2011 Chiltern District Council election
2015 Chiltern District Council election

By-election results

1995-1999

1999-2003

2003-2007

2007-2011

2011-2015

2015-2019

The Conservative candidate was previously elected unopposed.

References

By-election results

External links
 Chiltern Council

 
Chiltern District
Council elections in Buckinghamshire
District council elections in England